Chris Cook (born June 15, 1980) is an American cross-country skier. He competed in the men's sprint event at the 2006 Winter Olympics.

References

External links
 

1980 births
Living people
American male cross-country skiers
Olympic cross-country skiers of the United States
Cross-country skiers at the 2006 Winter Olympics
Sportspeople from Neenah, Wisconsin